Daisy Jones may refer to:

 Daisy Edgar-Jones, a British actress
 Daisy Jones & The Six, an American musical drama streaming television miniseries
 Daisy Makeig-Jones, pottery designer

See also 
 Daisy (given name), including a list of people and fictional characters with the name
 List of people with surname Jones, including fictional characters